Monster in the Creek is the first EP and second release by post-metal band Giant Squid. Many songs are about the Jersey Shore shark attacks of 1916.

Track listing
 "Monster in the Creek" – 7:10
 "Dead Man's Fog" – 5:55
 "Age of Accountability" – 6:45
 "Throwing a Donner Party" – 5:22
 "Dare We Ask the Widow" – 6:04
 "Lester Stillwell" – 3:27

Personnel
Aaron Gregory – vocals, guitar
Aurielle Gregory – guitar
Bryan Beeson – bass guitar
Andy Southard – keyboards, vocals
Mike Conroy – drums

Giant Squid (band) albums
2005 EPs